Kim Na-ri (born 4 April 1990) is a South Korean nearly inactive tennis player.

She has career-high WTA rankings of 285 in singles, achieved on 7 June 2010, and 221 in doubles, set on 20 August 2018. Kim has won five singles and 16 doubles titles on tournaments of the ITF Women's Circuit.

Playing for South Korea Fed Cup team, Kim has a win–loss record of 13–14 (singles: 3–3) in Fed Cup competition.

ITF Circuit finals

Singles: 11 (5 titles, 6 runner-ups)

Doubles: 24 (16 titles, 8 runner-ups)

External links
 
 
 

1990 births
Living people
South Korean female tennis players
Tennis players at the 2010 Asian Games
Tennis players at the 2018 Asian Games
Asian Games competitors for South Korea
21st-century South Korean women